Mala Oru Mangala Vilakku is a 1959 Indian Tamil-language film directed by S. Mukherjee. The film stars V. Nagayya, N. N. Kannappa and Madhuri Devi.

Plot

Cast 
List adapted from the database of Film News Anandan and from Thiraikalanjiyam.

Male cast
V. Nagayya
N. N. Kannappa
Duraisamy
Narayanapillai
Female cast
Madhuri Devi
Kamini
V. Saradambal

Production 
The film was produced by actress Madhuri Devi under the banner Radhakrishna Films. The director was S. Mukherjee, her husband, who also wrote the story. A. L. Narayanan wrote the dialogues. Cinematography was handled by C. J. Mohan Rao.

Soundtrack 
Music was composed by C. N. Pandurangan while the lyrics were penned by Villiputhan and Era. Pazhanichami.

References

External links 
 

1950s Tamil-language films